The Women's 10 metre Platform, also reported as platform diving, was one of four diving events on the Diving programme of 1992 Summer Olympics. It was held at Piscina Municipal de Montjuïc in Barcelona, Spain.

The competition was split into two phases:

Preliminary round – Sunday, 26 July
Divers performed a set of six dives; the twelve divers with the highest scores advanced to the final.
Final round – Monday, 27 July
Divers performed a set of eight dives to determine the final ranking.

Results

References

Sources

External links
Sports-Reference

Women
1992
1992 in women's diving
Div